Telciu is a commune in Bistrița-Năsăud County, Transylvania, Romania. It is composed of four villages: Bichigiu (part of Coșbuc until 2004; Bükkös), Fiad (Bánffytelep), Telcișor, and Telciu.

The commune is located in the northern part of the county,  from its capital, Bistrița, on the border with Maramureș County. It is crossed by national road , which runs straight north from Bistrița to Moisei, close to the Ukrainian border. Train stations in Bichigiu, Telciu, Fiezel, and Fiad serve a Căile Ferate Române rail line.

Telciu lies in a hilly area, at the foot of the Rodna Mountains. The river Sălăuța flows through Telciu; two of its right tributaries, the rivers Fiad and Bichigiu, discharge into the Sălăuța in the eponymous villages. The Tăușoare-Zalion Reserve is located on the administrative territory of the commune.

According to the 2011 census, the commune has 5,798 inhabitants, of which 95.81% are ethnic Romanians.

Natives
Valeria Peter Predescu (1947–2009), folk music singer
Gelu Vlașin (born 1966), poet and essayist

References

External links

Communes in Bistrița-Năsăud County
Localities in Transylvania